Irish Women's Cup may  refer to:

 IFA Women's Challenge Cup, the senior cup competition of women's football teams in Northern Ireland.
 FAI Women's Cup, the senior cup competition for women's association football teams in the Republic of Ireland.
 Irish Senior Cup (women's hockey), a knockout trophy played for by field hockey clubs in Ireland.
 Irish Junior Cup (women's hockey), a knockout trophy played for by field hockey clubs in Ireland.